The 1974 EuroHockey Club Champions Cup, taking place in Utrecht, was the inaugural official edition of Europe's premier field hockey club competition. The group stage format was preserved. It was won by SC 1880 Frankfurt, which had already won the last three unofficial editions.

Standings
  SC 1880 Frankfurt
  SV Kampong
  Rot-Weiss Cologne HC
  Royal Léopold Club
  CD Terrassa
  Lyon
  Warta Poznań
  Levante
  Hounslow HC
  Rot-Weiss Wettingen
  Pembroke Wanderers HC
  København

References

See also
European Hockey Federation

EuroHockey Club Champions Cup
International field hockey competitions hosted by the Netherlands
EuroHockey Club Champions Cup
EuroHockey Club Champions Cup
EuroHockey Club Champions Cup